Pedro Pompilio (11 November 1949 — 30 October 2008 in Bernal, Buenos Aires) was a football businessman and chairman of Boca Juniors. He began his mandate at the club on 4 December 2007 and it lasted until his death on 30 October 2008 due to heart problems. He was also the second Vice President of the Argentinian Football Association (Asociación del Fútbol Argentino).

Sources
 Murió el presidente Boca Pedro Pompilio

1949 births
2008 deaths
Argentine people of Italian descent
20th-century Argentine businesspeople
Chairmen of Boca Juniors